Mateo Mužek (born 29 April 1995) is a Croatian professional football player who plays as a left back for Armenian Premier League side Alashkert.

Career
On 28 July 2017, Mužek signed a two-year contract with Neftchi Baku. He left the club on 21 February 2018.

On 26 January 2019, Mužek signed for Scottish Premiership side St. Mirren on deal until the end of the season. Muzek left Saints at the end of his contract, and signed for Sheriff Tiraspol. Muzek signed a two-year contract with Greek side AE Larisa on a free transfer on January 17, 2020.

On 31 January 2023, Alashkert announced the signing of Mužek.

Personal life
His father Damir played professionally in Austria.

References

External links
 

1995 births
Living people
Footballers from Graz
Association football fullbacks
Croatian footballers
Croatia youth international footballers
Croatia under-21 international footballers
NK Hrvatski Dragovoljac players
HNK Gorica players
NK Zavrč players
NK Rudar Velenje players
Neftçi PFK players
FC Shakhter Karagandy players
St Mirren F.C. players
FC Sheriff Tiraspol players
Athlitiki Enosi Larissa F.C. players
NK Radomlje players
FC Kyzylzhar players
First Football League (Croatia) players
Slovenian PrvaLiga players
Azerbaijan Premier League players
Kazakhstan Premier League players
Scottish Professional Football League players
Moldovan Super Liga players
Super League Greece players
Croatian expatriate footballers
Expatriate footballers in Slovenia
Croatian expatriate sportspeople in Slovenia
Expatriate footballers in Azerbaijan
Croatian expatriate sportspeople in Azerbaijan
Expatriate footballers in Kazakhstan
Croatian expatriate sportspeople in Kazakhstan
Expatriate footballers in Scotland
Croatian expatriate sportspeople in Scotland
Expatriate footballers in Moldova
Croatian expatriate sportspeople in Moldova
Expatriate footballers in Greece
Croatian expatriate sportspeople in Greece